Cernadilla is a municipality located in La Carballeda comarca, province of Zamora, Castile and León, Spain. According to the 2009 census (INE), the municipality has a population of 160 inhabitants.

Villages
 Cernadilla
Anta de Tera
San Salvador de Palazuelos 
Valdemerilla

References

Municipalities of the Province of Zamora